Events in the year 1996 in Japan.

The year 1996 corresponded to Heisei 8 (平成8年) in the Japanese calendar.

Incumbents
 Emperor: Akihito
 Prime Minister: Tomiichi Murayama (S–Ōita) until January 11, Ryūtarō Hashimoto (L–Okayama)
 Chief Cabinet Secretary: Kōken Nosaka (S–Tottori) until January 11, Seiroku Kajiyama (L–Ibaraki)
 Chief Justice of the Supreme Court: Tōru Miyoshi
 President of the House of Representatives: Takako Doi (S–Hyōgo) until September 27 (dissolution), Sōichirō Itō (L–Miyagi) from November 7
 President of the House of Councillors: Jūrō Saitō (L–Mie)
 Diet sessions: 135th (extraordinary, January 11 to January 13), 136th (regular, January 22 to June 19), 137th (extraordinary, September 27, HR dissolved on same day), 138th (special, November 7 to November 12), 139th (extraordinary, November 29 to December 18)

Governors
Aichi Prefecture: Reiji Suzuki 
Akita Prefecture: Kikuji Sasaki 
Aomori Prefecture: Morio Kimura 
Chiba Prefecture: Takeshi Numata 
Ehime Prefecture: Sadayuki Iga 
Fukui Prefecture: Yukio Kurita
Fukuoka Prefecture: Wataru Asō 
Fukushima Prefecture: Eisaku Satō
Gifu Prefecture: Taku Kajiwara 
Gunma Prefecture: Hiroyuki Kodera 
Hiroshima Prefecture: Yūzan Fujita 
Hokkaido: Tatsuya Hori
Hyogo Prefecture: Toshitami Kaihara 
Ibaraki Prefecture: Masaru Hashimoto 
Ishikawa Prefecture: Masanori Tanimoto
Iwate Prefecture: Hiroya Masuda 
Kagawa Prefecture: Jōichi Hirai 
Kagoshima Prefecture: Yoshiteru Tsuchiya (until 26 June); Tatsurō Suga (starting 31 July)
Kanagawa Prefecture: Hiroshi Okazaki 
Kochi Prefecture: Daijiro Hashimoto 
Kumamoto Prefecture: Joji Fukushima 
Kyoto Prefecture: Teiichi Aramaki 
Mie Prefecture: Masayasu Kitagawa 
Miyagi Prefecture: Shirō Asano 
Miyazaki Prefecture: Suketaka Matsukata 
Nagano Prefecture: Gorō Yoshimura 
Nagasaki Prefecture: Isamu Takada 
Nara Prefecture: Yoshiya Kakimoto
Niigata Prefecture: Ikuo Hirayama 
Oita Prefecture: Morihiko Hiramatsu 
Okayama Prefecture: Shiro Nagano (until 12 November); Masahiro Ishii (starting 12 November)
Okinawa Prefecture: Masahide Ōta
Osaka Prefecture: Knock Yokoyama 
Saga Prefecture: Isamu Imoto 
Saitama Prefecture: Yoshihiko Tsuchiya
Shiga Prefecture: Minoru Inaba 
Shiname Prefecture: Nobuyoshi Sumita 
Shizuoka Prefecture: Yoshinobu Ishikawa 
Tochigi Prefecture: Fumio Watanabe
Tokushima Prefecture: Toshio Endo 
Tokyo: Yukio Aoshima
Tottori Prefecture: Yuji Nishio 
Toyama Prefecture: Yutaka Nakaoki
Wakayama Prefecture: Isamu Nishiguchi 
Yamagata Prefecture: Kazuo Takahashi 
Yamaguchi Prefecture: Toru Hirai (until 22 August); Sekinari Nii (starting 22 August)
Yamanashi Prefecture: Ken Amano

Events

 January 11 – Ryutaro Hashimoto, leader of the Liberal Democratic Party, becomes Prime Minister.
 February 10 – A boulder falls onto the Toyohama Tunnel in Furubira, Hokkaido, crushing a bus and several cars and resulting in 20 fatalities.
 February 27 – Red and Green was released in Japan as the first game in the Pokémon series.
 April 1 - Tokyo Big Sight opens.
 June 13 - Garuda Indonesia Flight 865 crashes on takeoff from Fukuoka Airport, resulting in three fatalities.
 June 23 - The Nintendo 64 video game system is released in Japan.
 June 25 - A train on the Takayama Main Line collides with a fallen boulder, resulting in 16 injuries.
 July 16 – An outbreak of E. coli food poisoning in Sakai City resulted in 6309 schoolchildren and 92 school staff members from 62 municipal elementary schools falling ill.
 August 8 - Tokyo Opera City Tower is completed.
 November 12 – Skymark Airlines was established.
 November 26 - Tamagotchi is released.
 December 6 - Gamahara Swamp Landslide disaster, A landslide recurs, during restoration work for landslide by heaviest rain hit in July 1995, borders between Nagano Prefecture and Niigata Prefecture, according to Japan Fire and Disaster Management Agency confirmed report, 14 workers were lost to lives, nine were wounded.

Fashion and Rebellion
In the 1990s in Japan, we begin to see an influx of growth in the fashion community. The infamous Harajuku style, as well as the birth of a popular style known as Gyaru. Both fashion styles as well as the many sub groups of fashion in Japan, were built due to the idea that most youth in Japan were tired of being conformed into one look. We begin to see Japan break away from the idea of being a country built on tradition and monotony, and branch into what it has come today; a colorful and vibrant place.

Births
 January 10 - Sakurako Ohara,  actress and singer
 January 12 - Ai Hashimoto, actress and fashion model
 January 13 - Ami Inamura, gravure idol, and sportscaster
 February 7 - Mai Hagiwara, singer
 February 10
Shiori Niiyama, singer and songwriter
Ukyo Shuto, professional baseball player
 February 16 - Nana Komatsu, actress and model
 February 18 - Ikumi Hisamatsu, fashion model and actress
 April 3 - Mayo Hibi, tennis player
 May 18 - Yuki Kadono, snowboarder
 May 21 - Sarina Koga, volleyball player
 May 28 - Ayano Kudo, model and actress
 June 11 
 Naoki Maeda, footballer
 Ayaka Sasaki, singer
 June 30 – Kazuma Okamoto, professional baseball player (Tokyo Giants)
 July 5 - Risa Shoji, figure skater
 July 18 - Shiina Natsukawa, voice actress and singer
 August 24 - Kenzo Shirai, gymnast
 September 6 - Rika Hongo, figure skater
 September 12 - Nakamura Umemaru, actor
 September 15 - Nao Furuhata, idol singer
 September 19 - Haruka Kodama, idol singer
 October 8 - Sara Takanashi, ski jumper
 October 30 - Mizuki Fukumura, singer
 November 9 - Momo Hirai, singer and member of South Korean girl group Twice
 November 15 - Kanako Watanabe, swimmer
 November 16 - Hiroshi Kaino, professional baseball player
 November 18 - Saki Ogawa, singer
 December 2 – Minato Oike, BMX freestyle cyclist
 December 12 - Karen Miyama, actress
 December 13 - Miu Sato, figure skater
 December 29 - Sana Minatozaki, singer and member of South Korean girl group Twice

Deaths
January 7 – Tarō Okamoto, artist (b. 1911)
January 8 – Michiya Mihashi, enka singer (b. 1930)
February 12 – Ryōtarō Shiba, writer (b. 1923)
February 20 – Tōru Takemitsu, composer (b. 1930)
May 11 – Yasuko Namba, mountaineer, summited the Seven Summits (b. 1949)
June 6 – Kusuo Kitamura, Olympic swimmer (b. 1917)
July 30 – Arihiro Hase, actor and voice actor (b. 1965)
August 4 – Kiyoshi Atsumi, actor (Otoko wa Tsurai yo) (b. 1928)
September 23 – Fujiko F. Fujio, cartoonist (b. 1933)
September 29 – Shūsaku Endō, novelist (b. 1923)

See also
 1996 in Japanese television
 List of Japanese films of 1996

References

 
Years of the 20th century in Japan
Japan
Japan